Dandenong Thunder SC is a soccer club from Dandenong, a suburb in the South-East region of Melbourne, Victoria, Australia. They are an Albanian Australian-backed club. Thunder compete in the National Premier Leagues Victoria.

In 2012, Dandenong claimed the famous treble of the Victorian Premier League Minor Premiership, the Football Federation Victoria State Knockout Cup and the VPL championship.

History
The club was founded by Albanian migrants in 1970 as South Dandenong. Some of the club's founders were Qamil Rexhepi, Amet Coca, Shaban Musa, Hamz Veseli and others. The club sometimes had the additional name Prishtina added to support the 1981 student protests campaigning for Kosovan independence in Pristina, Kosovo. Fadil Muriqi, a prominent 1980s soccer midfielder from Kosovo played at the club. 

Club membership is mainly composed of Albanians with origins from Kišava, a village in south-western North Macedonia. The committee of Dandenong Thunder, an influential organisation among Dandenong Albanians has it stipulated in the club constitution that only individuals with Albanian origins can be on its board. The grounds of Dandenong Thunder host the Qamil Rexhepi Cup, named after one of the club's founders Qamil Rexhepi and is played annually in January between local Albanian Melbourne based soccer clubs. Club grounds are also used by Albanians for community events and other functions, often organised by the local Albanian-Australian Community Association. The club logo is the Albanian double-headed eagle from the Albanian flag. Dandenong Thunder is primarily backed and supported by Albanian Australians living in Melbourne.

Early years
South Dandenong started competing in the Victorian District League East Division, which was the 6th tier of football (soccer) in Victorian Football Pyramid. They played in the Provisional leagues until merging with Richmond United, and played under that name for the 1987 season in the 8th tier Provisional League Division 3.
The following season, they were renamed back to South Dandenong and started the rise through the divisions. By 1992 they had reached State League Division 3, and from 1994 they continued their rise managing to get promotion to a higher level each year until they reached the Victorian Premier League, the highest level in Victoria, in 1998.

2000–2013
South Dandenong returned to the Victorian Premier League in 2001 but were relegated again as the season ended.

At the end of the 2000 season, South Dandenong underwent a name change, becoming Dandenong Thunder for the 2001 season. They spent the next seven seasons in the Victorian State League Division 1. The Club began spending more on players in 2007, bringing in Veton Korcari from Richmond SC and Louis Brain, a former A-League player for Adelaide United and were promoted from State League 1 in 2008.

Thunder surprised everyone in their return to the top flight, clinching the 2009 Victorian Premier League Minor Premiership with a lead of 12 points. Thunder managed to go undefeated for the first 15 rounds of the season, taking their running total to 31 games undefeated, stretching back to Round 5 of the 2008 season. Individual player achievements included youngster Jack Hingert being selected to play for A-League side North Queensland Fury and Joey Di Iorio winning the golden boot. Despite their season long domination, Thunder eventually lost the Grand Final to Altona Magic SC on penalties.

In the 2012 season, Thunder managed a famous treble, the first in their history. They won the Victorian State Knockout Cup, beating Port Melbourne Sharks in the Grand Final on penalties, the Minor Premiership and the Championship, beating Oakleigh Cannons 2–1 in the Grand Final at AAMI Park. This was their first ever VPL Championship.

National Premier Leagues Victoria
In late 2013, the club had their bid for a place in the National Premier Leagues Victoria accepted and competed in the top tier of the NPL Victoria in 2014. Thunder placed 9th in the 14 team league in 2014. Young winger Matthew Millar was the club's top goalscorer with seven goals, also winning the NPL Rising Star award.

In 2015, Thunder slashed its budget in an attempt to reduce club debt, and replaced many higher earners with young and inexperienced but talented players. Then manager Dean Hennessey also departed, joining Hume City, and the club brought in Stuart Munro as the new head coach. The season didn't go to plan, though, with the team struggling to put together good performances. Relegation was confirmed in Round 25, when the side lost 3–0 to North Geelong Warriors.

In the off-season, Thunder named Huss Skenderovic as the coach for the 2016 NPL1 season, and announced the signings of former Melbourne Victory FC player Kristian Sarkies, former Socceroo Simon Colosimo and English striker Brandon Barnes. Dandenong Thunder opened its NPL2 East campaign with 15 consecutive wins, before a 3–3 draw against NPL2 West leaders Whittlesea Ranges. On 14 April, Dandenong were deducted three league points after being found guilty by the Football Federation Victoria tribunal of fielding ineligible player Amir Osmančević in Round 1, where he should have sat out through a suspension accumulated the previous season while at his previous club. Thunder's first loss of the season came in Round 21, when it unexpectedly went down to Box Hill United 2-1. Thunder lost three more games in the final seven games of the season, leading to Kingston City winning the league title on the final match day of the season. Dandy's second place finish meant it went to the NPL2 promotion playoff, facing North Geelong Warriors, whom they had beaten 2–0 at Elcho Park earlier in the season. Despite going into the clash as favourites, Thunder went down 4–1, North Geelong condemning the side to NPL2 football for the second season running. At the end of season awards night, Thunder marksman Barnes took out both the league Top Goalscorer, with an NPL2 record 41 goals, and league Best and Fairest awards.

Dandenong Thunder lost senior head manager Huss Skenderović as he joined Adelaide United FC to become the A-League side's head W-League and National Youth League coach. Thunder began its preparations for 2017 by appointing Italian Giuseppe Anastasi as its new head coach for the 2017 NPL2 East season. Thunder had to change coaches just a few weeks later, as Anastasi was unable to travel to Australia due to family reasons. Dandenong reacted by appointing Gianfranco Impellizzeri to the helm. The race to promotion from NPL2 East was contested for most of the season between Thunder and neighbours Dandenong City SC. Led by Barnes, who scored 35 goals in 28 games, winning the league golden boot again, Thunder achieved promotion by taking out the NPL2 East title.

Despite promotion, Thunder and Impellizzeri parted ways in the off-season and the club appointed Andy Vargas as the new head manager. Thunder started the 2018 NPL season with four consecutive losses, including an embarrassing 9-0 loss to South Melbourne at home. Thunder won six of its next nine games and pulled itself well clear of the relegation zone. On 7 June 2018, Veton Korcari ceased playing with Thunder to take up the recently vacated coaching role. Korcari had been a long-serving and well regarded player at Thunder. Thunder finished the season in 8th place with Barnes taking out the league golden boot for the third season running, scoring 22 goals.

In 2019, Thunder avoided automatic relegation on the final day of the home-and-away season with a 4-1 win over Melbourne Knights FC. The result sent Thunder to the promotion-relegation playoff, where they defeated FC Bulleen Lions at Melbourne Rectangular Stadium 1-0 through a Barnes goal. Barnes finished 3rd in the league Golden Boot race, scoring 19 goals. After the season, it was announced that Barnes would be leaving the club after scoring 119 goals in 116 games. A week later, it was announced that head coach Korcari would also be leaving the club by mutual consent.

Current squad
As of February 2023

{{fs player

Previous players
See: Dandenong Thunder SC players

Honours
2017- National Premier Leagues Victoria 2 Champions
2012– Victorian Premier League Premiers
2012– Victorian Premier League Minor Premiers
2012– Dockerty Cup Winners (FFV State Knockout Cup)
2009– Victorian Premier League Minor Premiers
2008– Victorian State League Division 1 Runners-Up
2000– Victorian State League Division 1 Champion
1997– Victorian State League Division 1 Champion
1996– Victorian State League Division 2 Runners-Up
1995– Victorian State League Division 3 Runners-Up
1991– Victorian State League Division 4 Runners-Up
1990– Victorian Provisional League 1 Champion
1989– Victorian Provisional League 2 Runners-Up
1988– Victorian Provisional League 3 Champion

Individual honours
2016– NPL2 Best and Fairest: Brandon Barnes
2016– NPL2 Players' Player of the Year: Brandon Barnes
2016– NPL2 Golden Boot: Brandon Barnes
2016– NPL2 Goalkeeper of the Year: Fraser Maclaren
2014– NPL Rising Star Winner: Matthew Millar
2012– Jimmy Rooney Medalist: Nate Foster
2012– Jimmy McKay Medalist: Shane Rexhepi
2012– Victorian Premier League Goalkeeper of the Year: Stuart Webster
2012– Victorian Premier League Coach of the Year: Chris Taylor
2012– Victorian Premier League Leading Goal Scorer: Luke Sherbon
2012– Bill Fleming Media Award Player of the Year: Luke Sherbon
2009– Victorian Premier League Coach of the Year: Stuart Munro
2009– Victorian Premier League Leading Goal Scorer: Joe Di Iorio

Top goal-scorers
2017– Brandon Barnes 35 goals (Awarded League Golden Boot)
2016– Brandon Barnes 41 goals (Awarded League Golden Boot)
2015– Yusuf Ahmed 11 goals
2014– Matthew Millar 7 goals
2013– Unknown
2012– Luke Sherbon 21 goals  (Awarded League Golden Boot)
2011– Luke Sherbon 14 goals
2010– Jamie Reed 6 Goals
2009– Joe Di Iorio 18 Goals (Awarded League Golden Boot)
2008– Ryan Davidson 11 Goals
2007– Veton Korcari 10 Goals (Runner up in the league)
2006– Ryan Davidson 9 Goals
2005– Leon Buhic 9 Goals
2004– Veton Korcari 9 Goals
2003– Miles Tidd, Joey Di Iorio 11 Goals
2002– Alfonso Opazo 10 Goals
2001– Boris Ovcin 4 Goals
2000– Victor Korkaric 17 Goals
1999– Nick Van Egmond, Billy Wright 7 Goals
1998– Pino Corallo, Reshat Mezensof 11 Goals
1997– Billy Wright 28 Goals (Top scorer in the league)
1996– Billy Wright 30 Goals (Top scorer in the league)
1995– Billy Wright 27 Goals (Joint Top scorer in the league)
1994– Billy Wright 22 Goals (Top scorer in the league)

Club Champion Award
2012 – Luke Sherbon
2011 – Shane Rexhepi
2010 – Levent Osman
2009 – Levent Osman
2008 – Levent Osman

References

External links
Official Website Club History (archived)
Dandenong Thunder club information at Oz Football
Club divisional history

Dandenong Thunder SC
National Premier Leagues clubs
Soccer clubs in Melbourne
Victorian Premier League teams
Association football clubs established in 1970
1970 establishments in Australia
European-Australian culture
Dandenong, Victoria
Diaspora sports clubs in Australia
Sport in the City of Greater Dandenong